The Legislature VI of Italy was the 6th legislature of the Italian Republic, and lasted from 25 May 1972 until 4 July 1976. Its composition was the one resulting from the general election of 7 May 1972.

Main chronology
After a short Giulio Andreotti's government, Mariano Rumor returned to the office of Prime Minister, leading a centre-left coalition composed by DC, PSI, PRI, and PSDI from July 1973 to March 1974. After this government collapsed, Rumor formed a new coalition from March until October 1974.

During Rumor's second term, the Parliament approved a law on 2 March 1974 with which legal minimum for pensions was raised to 27.75% of the average industrial wage for 1973. A law approved on 16 July 1974 extended family allowances to INPS pensioners, in lieu of child supplements. While a bill passed in August 1974 extended hospital assistance to all those not previously covered by any scheme.

Weathering a cabinet resignation in June 1974, Rumor's final cabinet fell in October 1974 after failing to come to an agreement on how to deal with rising economic inflation.

In November 1974, President Giovanni Leone gave Aldo Moro the task of form a new cabinet; Moro was sworn in on 23 November, at the head a cabinet composed by DC and PRI, externally supported by PSI and PSDI. Even during his second term as Prime Minister, the government implemented a series of important social reforms. A law, approved on 9 June 1975, increased the number of occupational diseases and extended the duration of linked insurance and benefit; while a bill, approved on 3 June 1975, introduced various improvements for pensioners. Moreover, the multiplying coefficient was raised to 2% and it was applied to average earnings of the best 3 years in the last 10 years of work and automatic annual adjustment of minimum pensions. A law approved 27 December 1975 implemented ad hoc upgradings of cash benefits for certain diseases.

Despite the tensions within government's majority, the close relations between Moro and the communist leader, Enrico Berlinguer, guaranteed a certain stability to Moro's governments, allowing them a capacity to act that went beyond the premises that had seen them born.

Moro IV Cabinet, with the republican leader Ugo La Malfa as Deputy Prime Minister, started a first dialogue with the PCI, with the aim of beginning a new phase to strengthen the Italian democratic system. However, in 1976 the PSI secretary, Francesco De Martino, withdrew the external support to the government and Moro was forced to resign.

On 4 May 1976 President Giovanni Leone dismissed the Parliament and called a snap election.

1974 divorce referendum

In June 1973 Amintore Fanfani was elected secretary of the Christian Democracy for a second term, replacing his former protégé Arnaldo Forlani, who was now a supporter of centrist policies. As such, Fanfani led the campaign for the referendum on repealing the law allowing divorce, which was approved by the parliament in 1970. Those voting "yes" wanted to outlaw divorce as had been the case before the law came into effect, and those voting "no" wanted to retain the law and their newly gained right to divorce. The voting method caused significant confusion with many people not understanding that they had to vote "no" to be able to divorce or vote "yes" to outlaw divorce.

The DC and the neo-fascist MSI intensely campaigned for a yes vote to abolish the law and make divorce illegal again. Their main themes were the safeguarding of the traditional nuclear family model and the Roman Catechism; while most left-wing political forces, including PCI and PSI, supported the "no" faction. Fanfani thought that a "no" victory could have given him the control of in his own party again; in fact other key figures like Moro, Rumor, Emilio Colombo and Francesco Cossiga, who believed in the defeat at the referendum, kept a low profile during the campaign.

Despite Fanfani's activism, the "no" front was defeated by margin of 59.3% to 40.7% on a voter turnout of 87.7%, thus allowing the divorce laws to remain in force. The soundly defeat in the divorce referendum forced Fanfani's resignation as party secretary in July 1975. The ideological distances between DC and other allies of the Organic Centre-left coalition emerged during the referendum campaign were one of the main factor that led to the crisis of that political alliance in the mid 1970s.

Government

Parliamentary composition

Chamber of Deputies

 President: Sandro Pertini (PSI), elected on 25 May 1972
 Vice Presidents: Benigno Zaccagnini (DC, till 22 September 1975), Oscar Luigi Scalfaro (DC, from 22 October 1975), Nilde Iotti (PCI), Arrigo Boldrini (PCI), Roberto Lucifredi (DC)

Senate of the Republic

Presidents: 
Amintore Fanfani (DC), elected on 25 May 1972 and resigned on 26 June 1973;
Giovanni Spagnolli (DC), elected on 27 June 1973. 
 Vice Presidents: Giuseppe Spataro (DC), Francesco Albertini (PSI), Mario Venanzi (PCI), Tullio Carettoni Romagnoli (PSI)

Senators for Life

References

Legislatures of Italy
1972 establishments in Italy
1976 disestablishments in Italy